The Rutshuru River is a river in the eastern Democratic Republic of the Congo that drains Lake Mutanda in the foothills of the Virunga Mountains in Uganda, flowing northward into Lake Rutanzige (formerly Lake Edward).  For most of its length it runs through the Rutshuru Territory in North Kivu province.

Course

The Rutshuru is considered the highest source of the Nile.

Lake Bunyoni drains into the Ruhuhuma Swamp at its northern end.

Lake Mutanda discharges from its south-west corner through the Kako River and the Tshengere Swamp into the Rutshuru.

At one time, what is now Lake Kivu was in the watershed of the Rutshuru River. Volcanic eruptions at the end of the Pliocene epoch created the Virunga Mountains, blocking off this part of the drainage basin. The water rose inside the basin to form Lake Kivu, eventually breaking through at the southern end to drain into Lake Tanganyika.

In its lower reaches, the river flows through the central section of the Virunga National Park.

The Rutshuru, Rwindi and Ishasha rivers form swamps and grasslands to the south of Lake Rutanzige.

The river is home to herds of hippopotami. As of 2007, there were about 115 hippopotami per kilometer of the savannah and grass steppe along the Rutshuru River.

There has been discussion about damming the river, which would have a serious impact on the downstream riverine wetlands.

References

Sources

Rivers of the Democratic Republic of the Congo
Lake Edward
Virunga Mountains
Rivers of Uganda
International rivers of Africa
Nile basin